"I Don't Want to Talk About It" is a song written by American guitarist Danny Whitten. It was first recorded by American rock band Crazy Horse and issued as the final track on side one of their 1971 eponymous album. It was Whitten's signature tune, but gained more fame via its numerous cover versions, especially that by Rod Stewart. Cash Box magazine has described it as "a magnificent ballad outing."

Original recording personnel
 Danny Whitten — guitar, lead vocals
 Nils Lofgren — guitar, backing vocals
 Ry Cooder — slide guitar
 Billy Talbot — bass guitar

Rod Stewart version

British singer Rod Stewart recorded the song at Muscle Shoals Sound Studio in Sheffield, Alabama, for his album Atlantic Crossing. This became successful when it was released as a single in 1977, and it was re-released as a single in 1979. In the United States, it became a top fifty hit on the Billboard Hot 100 in early 1980, peaking at number 46 on the Hot 100, and number 44 Adult Contemporary. In New Zealand, it peaked at number 2. In the United Kingdom, it topped the UK Singles Chart as a double A-side with "The First Cut Is the Deepest" in 1977. The song is widely believed to have benefitted from being deliberately released as a budget single in order to keep the Sex Pistols' "God Save the Queen" off the top of the UK Singles Chart. In February 2021, the song received a silver certification from the British Phonographic Industry for sales and streams of over 200,000.

In 1989, Stewart recorded a new version of "I Don't Want to Talk About It" for Storyteller – The Complete Anthology: 1964–1990. It was later included on Downtown Train – Selections from the Storyteller Anthology and released as a single in 1990. It received extensive airplay on adult contemporary radio stations in the United States as an album cut, reaching number two on the Billboard Adult Contemporary chart. Stewart also sang this song as a duet with Amy Belle during his 2004 tour and it is included in his concert DVD. The official Rod Stewart video of the performance has received over 545 million Youtube views (as of December 16, 2021).

Charts

Weekly charts

Year-end charts

Everything but the Girl version

In 1988, English musical duo Everything but the Girl released their version of the song as a stand-alone single; it was later included on the reissue of their fourth studio album, Idlewild (1988). Tracey Thorn has said that Stewart had been regarded as "a heroic figure" in her home when she was growing up, and that her brother Keith owned the "albums with grimy-sounding titles like An Old Raincoat Won't Ever Let You Down, and Gasoline Alley". She herself had "always liked Atlantic Crossing."

This version was also met with success in the UK, peaking at number three on the UK Singles Chart. It was the duo's first British top-10 hit and would remain their only one until 1995, when the Todd Terry remix of "Missing" also peaked at number three. Outside the UK, the song reached number three in Ireland and number 19 in New Zealand.

Charts

Weekly charts

Year-end charts

Other cover versions
 In 1988, Arthur Conley, (famous for his 1967 hit "Sweet Soul Music") sang his version live on Dutch television. Conley had previously changed his name to Lee Roberts whilst living in The Netherlands.
 Other notable artists who have recorded versions of this song include Ian McNabb, Blue, Rita Coolidge, Billie Jo Spears, Ian Matthews, Nils Lofgren, Indigo Girls (on the Philadelphia soundtrack), Andy Williams and portuguese boyband, D'ZRT.

References

Rod Stewart songs
Everything but the Girl songs
Iain Matthews songs
1971 songs
1977 singles
1988 singles
Blanco y Negro Records singles
Riva Records singles
Song recordings produced by Bruce Botnick
Song recordings produced by Russ Titelman
Song recordings produced by Tom Dowd
Songs written by Danny Whitten
UK Singles Chart number-one singles